Mackenzie Hansen (born 27 March 1998) is an Australian-born rugby union player who plays for Connacht in the United Rugby Championship and the Ireland national team. His current position is wing, but has also played fullback. He made his debut for Ireland in the 2022 Six Nations tournament.

Career
He then signed a two-year deal with Connacht ahead of the 2021–22 season. 

Hansen, who is Australia-born, appeared for Australia at the 2018 World Rugby Under 20 Championship. He is eligible to represent Ireland through his Cork-born mother.
Hansen was included in the Ireland squad for the 2022 Six Nations Championship when head coach Andy Farrell announced it in January 2022. 

He was selected in the starting XV for his debut, and impressed in Ireland's opening 29–7 victory against Wales on 5 February, earning the player of the match award. Hansen was nominated for the 2022 World Rugby Breakthrough Player of the Year. He was called up to the Ireland squad again for the 2023 Six Nations Championship, helping secure a 34–20 victory over Italy with two tries in a player of the match performance in round 3. He scored another try and secured his third player-of-the-match performance in eight Six Nations matches in Ireland's 7–22 win over Scotland in round 4 of the 2023 Championship.

International Tries 
As of 12 March 2023

References

External links

Connacht Profile
Ireland Profile
URC Profile
.

1998 births
Living people
People educated at Daramalan College
Rugby union players from Canberra
Australian rugby union players
Canberra Vikings players
ACT Brumbies players
Connacht Rugby players
Ireland international rugby union players
Rugby union wings
Rugby union fullbacks
Irish rugby union players
Australian people of Irish descent